The ISA World SUP and Paddleboard Championship is the premier SUP/Paddleboard championship organised by the International Surfing Association. The competition has been held since 2012 and has taken place roughly annually since. There is a similar world championship in this discipline organized by the International Canoe Federation called the ICF Stand Up Paddling World Championships, which originated a litigation from ISA to the ICF. The arbitration was eventually ruled in favor of allowing to keep both championships by CAS, but giving ISA the international recognition of the sport in case of an entry at the Olympic Games.

Venues

Elite Medalists

Men

SUP Technical race

SUP Long distance

SUP Sprint race

Paddleboard technical race

Paddleboard long distance

SUP Surfing

Women

SUP Technical race

SUP Long distance

SUP Sprint

Paddleboard technical race

Paddleboard long distance

SUP Surfing

Mixed

Relay

Team points

References

 
World SUP and Paddleboard Championship
Recurring sporting events established in 2012